The 1999–2000 season was the first time SpVgg Unterhaching played in the 1. Bundesliga, the highest tier of the German football league system.

Season summary
SpVgg Unterhaching surprised everyone with a respectable 10th-place result in their inaugural Bundesliga season, and also famously played the spoiler's role in deciding who would win the championship that year. Their first Bundesliga win came in just their second match of the season, with a 2-0 victory over MSV Duisburg at home. While struggling in away matches, Unterhaching remained undefeated at home in nine games before losing 2-0 to their stronger neighbours, Bayern Munich. Prior to this loss, they had earned wins at home in matches against highly favoured teams like VfB Stuttgart and Borussia Dortmund, beating them 2-0 and 1-0 respectively. They earned their first away win in the Bundesliga by beating VfB Stuttgart 2-0 once again.

On the final matchday of the season, visiting Bayer Leverkusen needed only a draw in Unterhaching to secure their first national title, but instead went down to defeat to the determined home side. Things took a bad turn for Leverkusen when Michael Ballack scored an own goal that put home side ahead in the 20th minute. Their title hopes ended when Haching midfielder Markus Oberleitner made the score 2-0 in the 72nd minute. Meanwhile, Bayern Munich beat Werder Bremen 3-1 at home and were able to overtake Leverkusen on goal difference to snatch away the title.

With a 10th-place result, Unterhaching finished ahead of long-established sides Borussia Dortmund and Schalke 04. They ended the season with the league's fifth best home record with 10 wins and 5 draws in 17 matches, having lost only to Bayern Munich and 1. FC Kaiserslautern.

First team squad

References

External links 

SpVgg Unterhaching seasons
Unterhaching